George Lamb Hannah (25 September 1914 – 1977) was an English footballer.

Career
Hannah played for Washington Colliery and Derby County, before joining Port Vale in June 1938. He was an ever-present during the 1938–39 season, but lost his place in October 1939. He guested for Nottingham Forest and Mansfield Town during the war, returning to The Old Recreation Ground in August 1944 once Port Vale started playing regular football once again. He still could not establish himself in the first team however, and instead departed the club in the summer of 1946.

Career statistics
Source:

References

1914 births
1977 deaths
Footballers from Sunderland
English footballers
Association football midfielders
Washington Colliery F.C. players
Derby County F.C. players
Port Vale F.C. players
English Football League players